Cristatosybra jeanvoinei is a species of beetle in the family Cerambycidae, and the only species in the genus Cristatosybra. It was described by Pic in 1929.

References

Desmiphorini
Beetles described in 1929
Monotypic Cerambycidae genera